Rhamnus ilicifolia is a species of flowering plant in the buckthorn family known by the common name hollyleaf redberry. It is native to western North America, where it is a common plant growing in many types of habitat, including chaparral and wooded areas,  from Oregon through California, to Baja California and Arizona.

Description
Rhamnus ilicifolia is a species of perennial evergreen rambling shrub approaching four meters in maximum height. The thick leaves are oval to rounded with rounded tips, measuring 2 to 4 centimeters long. The edges are spiny-toothed and curve under, making the leaves concave. The inflorescence is a solitary flower or umbel of up to six flowers and generally smooth. The flower is inconspicuous and has four pointed sepals and no petals; flowers are typically unisexual. The bloom period is from April through June. The fruit is a drupe which ripens to bright shiny red. It is just under a centimeter wide and contains two seeds. Fruits ripen from late July until autumn depending on location. The bark is grey; branches generally ascend and twigs are smooth to finely hairy, the base is rounded and the tip is blunt. The plant has a specialized woody growth at the base called a lignotuber that supports adventitious buds for regeneration after fire.

Taxonomy 
Rhamnus ilicifolia was described by Albert Kellogg and published in Proceedings of the California Academy of Sciences 2: 37, in 1863.

Etymology 
Rhamnus: genus name that derives from the ancient greek name for buckthorn.

ilicifolia: latin epithet that means "ilex (holly) leaved."

Distribution and habitat 
Hollyleaf redberry is found in the western United States, distributed in California, southern Oregon, southern Nevada and Arizona. It is found in elevations below .

It grows in a diverse range of habitats including canyon slopes and bottoms, open hillsides, roadsides, rock faces, sandstone ridges, serpentine slopes and stream benches. It inhabits plant communities like the chaparral, chaparral-desert transition, coastal sage scrub, desert scrub, foothill woodland, meadows, montane forest plant communities, riparian areas and woodlands. in southern California, it provides significant cover in coastal sage scrub, in mid-elevation xeric and mesic chaparral, and, at higher elevations between 3,500 to 6000 feet, in montane chaparral. It is adapted to grow in a variety of soil types including alkaline, sand, clay and serpentine soils. It can tolerate shade and does well as an understory plant in lightly wooded areas. It can be found in areas with precipitation between 12 and 79 inches, and once established, the plants are very drought tolerant and can even tolerate occasional flooding.

Uses 
Hollyleaf redberry is used by wildlife as well as humans. The evergreen leaves provide cover for birds and small mammals and the berries which ripen in late summer and fall are also consumed by wildlife. The flowers are visited by pollinators, including moths and butterflies. Human uses include erosion control where it is grown on dry and rocky hillsides as well as bank stabilization. It is also available as an ornamental plant, grown for its red berries more than its inconspicuous flowers; It is drought tolerant and easy to maintain. Various indigenous groups of California used the plant. The Nüwa of the Tehachapi Mountains region of Southern California had used the decoctions of the bark and roots as medicine for coughs and colds and as a laxative. The Ukomno'om of the North Coast of California also reported the use of the inner bark as "good medicine. The Wintun, also of Northern California, reported using the wood for torches because of its density and long burn time.

References

External links
Jepson Manual Treatment - Rhamnus ilicifolia
USDA Plants Profile: Rhamnus ilicifolia
Rhamnus ilicifolia - Photo gallery

ilicifolia
Flora of Arizona
Flora of Baja California
Flora of California
Flora of Oregon
Flora of the California desert regions
Flora of the Cascade Range
Flora of the Klamath Mountains
Flora of the Sierra Nevada (United States)
Natural history of the California chaparral and woodlands
Natural history of the California Coast Ranges
Natural history of the Central Valley (California)
Natural history of the Channel Islands of California
Natural history of the Mojave Desert
Natural history of the Peninsular Ranges
Natural history of the San Francisco Bay Area
Natural history of the Santa Monica Mountains
Natural history of the Transverse Ranges
Taxa named by Albert Kellogg
Flora without expected TNC conservation status